The Paxillosida are a large order of sea stars.

Characteristics
Paxillosida adults lack an anus and have no suckers on their tube feet. They do not develop the brachiolaria stage in their early development. They possess marginal plates, and have sessile pedicellariae. They mostly inhabit soft-bottomed environments of sand or mud.

Systematics
Recent analyses suggest Paxillosida may be a sister taxon of Asterina. The order is divided into these families:
 family Astropectinidae Gray, 1840
 family Ctenodiscidae Sladen, 1889
 family Goniopectinidae Verrill, 1889
 family Luidiidae Sladen, 1889
 family Porcellanasteridae Sladen, 1883
 family Pseudarchasteridae
 family Radiasteridae Fisher, 1916

References